Ekpo is a surname and given name. Notable people with the name include:

Surname:
Akpan Hogan Ekpo (born 1954), Nigerian economist and professor
Comfort Ekpo (born 1954), Nigerian Vice Chancellor at the University of Uyo
Efioanwan Ekpo (born 1984), Nigerian female footballer
Emmanuel Ekpo (born 1987), Nigerian footballer
Felix Ekpo (born 1981), Nigerian weightlifter competing in the 77 kg category
Florence Ekpo-Umoh (born 1977), Nigerian-German sprinter who specializes in the 400 metres
Friday Ekpo (born 1969), Nigerian footballer
Isaac Ekpo (born 1982), Nigerian boxer
Margaret Ekpo (1914–2006), Nigerian women's rights activist
Mfon Ekpo (born 1982), Nigerian entrepreneur and author
Moses Ekpo, Nigerian politician, Deputy Governor of Akwa Ibom State

Given name:
Bassey Ekpo Bassey (born 1949), Nigerian journalist, politician and traditional ruler of the Efik people of the Akwa Akpa kingdom
Ekpo Eyo (1931–2011), Nigerian scholar mostly known for his work on archeology of Nigeria
Ekpo Una Owo Nta, Nigerian lawyer and Chairman of the Independent Corrupt Practices and Other Related Offences Commission

See also
Etim Ekpo, town and Local Government Area in Akwa Ibom State, Nigeria
Margaret Ekpo International Airport (IATA: CBQ, ICAO: DNCA), an airport serving Calabar in the Cross River State of Nigeria